Kathryn Olwen Farr (born 1967) is a former track and field athlete who competed for England in the discus throw.

Athletics career
Farr became the British and English champion when she won the 1987 UK Athletics Championships and the 1986 AAA Championships in the discus.

Farr represented England in the discus event, at the 1986 Commonwealth Games in Edinburgh, Scotland.

References

1967 births
Living people
English female discus throwers
British female discus throwers
Commonwealth Games competitors for England
Athletes (track and field) at the 1986 Commonwealth Games